The 2023 Baltimore Orioles season will be the 123rd season in Baltimore Orioles franchise history, the 70th in Baltimore, and the 32nd at Oriole Park at Camden Yards. The Orioles will look to improve on their 83–79 season from 2022, as well as make the playoffs for the first time since 2016.

Offseason 
The Orioles finished the 2022 season 83–79, their first season finishing at .500 or above since 2016 but finished 16 games out of 1st and missed the postseason for the sixth consecutive season.

Rule changes 
Pursuant to the CBA, new rule changes will be in place for the 2023 season:

 institution of a pitch clock between pitches;
 limits on pickoff attempts per plate appearance;
 limits on defensive shifts requiring two infielders to be on either side of second and be within the boundary of the infield; and
 larger bases (increased to 18-inch squares);

Awards 

Following his 2022 campaign, catcher Adley Rutschman was announced as runner-up for 2022 AL Rookie of the Year, finishing behind Seattle's Julio Rodriguez.

Ramón Urías was awarded a Gold Glove for his defensive work at third base in 2022. Toronto’s Matt Chapman and Cleveland’s José Ramírez were the other finalists for the AL third baseman honor. Cedric Mullins was also a finalist for the center field award, alongside Kansas City’s Michael A. Taylor and Cleveland's Myles Straw, who won at that position.

Prospect Heston Kjerstad was named MVP of the Arizona Fall League, an off-season league that provides an environment for top prospects to advance their development. Kjerstad had previously missed significant playing time since being drafted second overall in the 2020 amateur draft due to the cancellation of the 2020 minor league season, a bout of myocarditis in 2021, and a strained hamstring early in 2022.

Roster Moves

Arbitration 

Prior to the filing deadline, the Orioles tendered contracts to all six arbitration-eligible players (i.e. players with between three and six years of major league service time): Outfielder Anthony Santander agreed to $7.4M, outfielder Cedric Mullins agreed to $4.1M, outfielder Austin Hays agreed to $3.2M, shortstop Jorge Mateo agreed to $2M, and reliever Dillon Tate agreed to $1.5M. Only pitcher Austin Voth differed with the Orioles on his $2M request; the Orioles filed at $1.7M. Voth and the Orioles avoided arbitration by agreeing to $1.85M and an option for 2024 worth $2.45M plus escalators.

Additions 

In advance of the Rule 5 Draft, the Orioles selected the contracts of five prospects adding them to the 40-man roster. The group was headlined by top pitching prospect Grayson Rodriguez, and included pitchers Noah Denoyer, Seth Johnson, and Drew Rom, and infield prospect Joey Ortiz. During the major league portion of the draft, the Orioles added reliever Andrew Politi, who had been with the Boston Red Sox. 
 The Orioles did not lose any players in the major league portion of the draft, however infielder Jonathan Araúz, who had spent a brief period with the Orioles in 2022 was selected by the New York Mets in the AAA portion.

To re-inforce the major league team for 2023, the Orioles came to agreements with three free agents: starting pitcher Kyle Gibson received a one year contract for $10M, infielder Adam Frazier received a one year $8M contract, and Mychal Givens re-joined the Orioles on a one year $4M contract to bolster the back end of the bullpen. Givens was a former Oriole draft pick who previously pitched in parts of six seasons for the Orioles before being traded to Colorado.

Following the loss of back up catcher Robinson Chirinos to free agency, the Orioles acquired replacement veteran backstop James McCann in a trade with the Mets for cash and a player to be named later.

The Orioles acquired starting pitcher Cole Irvin and minor league pitcher Kyle Virbitsky from the Oakland Athletics for shortstop prospect Darrell Hernaiz.

Subtractions 

The Orioles parted ways with four XX(B)-type free agents, defined as players with at least six years of major league service time: catcher Robinson Chirinos, infielder Rougned Odor, first baseman Jesús Aguilar, and starting pitcher Jordan Lyles. The Orioles declined Lyles' option that would pay him $10M in 2023, making him a free agent.

Other major league role-players departing in free agency included pitchers Chris Ellis, Rico Garcia, Louis Head, and Alex Wells, outfielder and former first round pick DJ Stewart, and outfielder Yusniel Diaz, who was the centerpiece of the trade that sent star third baseman Manny Machado to the Dodgers.

On New Years Eve, the Orioles traded infielder Tyler Nevin to the Detroit Tigers in exchange for cash.

Minor Leagues 

In various waiver claims, the Orioles added catcher Mark Kolozsvary, outfielders Daz Cameron and Jake Cave, and first basemen Lewin Díaz and Ryan O'Hearn. With the exception of Cave, who was claimed by the Phillies, all of these players were successfully outrighted from the 40-man roster to the minor leagues. 

Additionally, the Orioles added major leaguers Curtis Terry, Reed Garrett, 
Franchy Cordero, 
Nomar Mazara, Josh Lester, Eduard Bazardo and Kyle Dowdy, along with minor league free agents Wandisson Charles and Ofreidy Gomez on minor league contracts.

On January 11, the Orioles acquired reliever Darwinzon Hernández from the Red Sox for cash considerations. The Orioles designated Hernández for assignment on January 26 after the Orioles acquired Irvin from the Athletics and outrighted him to AAA Norfolk.

Adding to their burgeoning young international program, the Orioles signed 16-year-old shortstop Luis Almeyda, a native of Paterson, New Jersey who moved to the Dominican Republic, for $2.3 million, a team record for an international prospect. In all, the Orioles signed 27 players, thirteen for more than $100,000.

Camden Yards 

In January 2023, the Orioles announced hospitality company Levy would replace Delaware North as the food and beverage partner at Oriole Park at Camden Yards.

Sport betting was legalized in Maryland after the signing of Maryland General Assembly bill HB940 in 2021, allowing for sports wagering at Camden Yards for the first time. A sports betting lounge is proposed to open during the 2023 season. The Orioles partnered with Nevada-based SuperBook Sports on the venue.

Angelos Family Controversy 

Owner Peter Angelos collapsed in 2017 due to the failure of his aortic valve, and established a trust with his wife, Georgia, and two sons Louis and John as co-trustees to manage the family’s assets. John was appointed chairman and CEO of the Orioles and Louis took over the Angelos lawfirm.

In June 2022, it was revealed that Louis filed a lawsuit against John, claiming that John was taking steps to seize control of the Orioles against his father's wishes that his mother, brother, and himself share control. Louis also alleged that John intended to sell or move the team to Tennessee where John has a home and his wife's career is headquartered.  Further court filings revealed that Louis alleges John and Georgia transferred approximately $65M in assets out of Peter's name and also used these assets to purchase additional stock in the Orioles. In response, Georgia sued Louis claiming he “abused his non-existent power as a successor co-agent purportedly to sell to himself Peter’s law firm” in order to "abscond with Peter’s legacy", according to her attorneys.

John Angelos made a public appearance in January 2023 with Baltimore mayor Brandon Scott to announce a $5M commitment to the CollegeBound Foundation, which empowers students at Baltimore schools to pursue a college degree or other post-secondary option. During the question-and-answer session with reporters, John once again stated that the Orioles would not leave Baltimore as he had in previous rebukes to news of the lawsuit, and controversially invoked Martin Luther King Jr. Day to dodge questions about his future role with ownership of the team.

On February 6, the family dropped all lawsuits against each other.

Regular season

Game Log  

|- bgcolor=
| 1 || March 30 || @ Red Sox || – || || || — || || – ||
|- bgcolor= 
| 2 || April 1 || @ Red Sox || – || || || — || || – ||
|- bgcolor= 
| 3 || April 2 || @ Red Sox || – || || || — || || – ||
|- bgcolor= 
| 4 || April 3 || @ Rangers || – || || || — || || – ||
|- bgcolor= 
| 5 || April 4 || @ Rangers || – || || || — || || – ||
|- bgcolor= 
| 6 || April 5 || @ Rangers || – || || || — || || – ||
|- bgcolor=#f7e1d7
| 7 || April 6 || Yankees || – || || || — || || – ||
|- bgcolor=#f7e1d7
| 8 || April 8 || Yankees || – || || || — || || – ||
|- bgcolor=#f7e1d7
| 9 || April 9 || Yankees || – || || || — || || – ||
|- bgcolor=#f7e1d7
| 10 || April 10 || Athletics || – || || || — || || – ||
|- bgcolor=#f7e1d7
| 11 || April 11 || Athletics || – || || || — || || – ||
|- bgcolor=#f7e1d7
| 12 || April 12 || Athletics || – || || || — || || – ||
|- bgcolor=#f7e1d7
| 13 || April 13 || Athletics || – || || || — || || – ||
|- bgcolor= 
| 14 || April 14 || @ White Sox || – || || || — || || – ||
|- bgcolor= 
| 15 || April 15 || @ White Sox || – || || || — || || – ||
|- bgcolor= 
| 16 || April 16 || @ White Sox || – || || || — || || – ||
|- bgcolor= 
| 17 || April 18 || @ Nationals || – || || || — || || – ||
|- bgcolor= 
| 18 || April 19 || @ Nationals || – || || || — || || – ||
|- bgcolor=#f7e1d7
| 19 || April 21 || Tigers || – || || || — || || – ||
|- bgcolor=#f7e1d7
| 20 || April 22 || Tigers || – || || || — || || – ||
|- bgcolor=#f7e1d7
| 21 || April 23 || Tigers || – || || || — || || – ||
|- bgcolor=#f7e1d7
| 22 || April 24 || Red Sox || – || || || — || || – ||
|- bgcolor=#f7e1d7
| 23 || April 25 || Red Sox || – || || || — || || – ||
|- bgcolor=#f7e1d7
| 24 || April 26 || Red Sox || – || || || — || || – ||
|- bgcolor= 
| 25 || April 27 || @ Tigers || – || || || — || || – ||
|- bgcolor= 
| 26 || April 28 || @ Tigers || – || || || — || || – ||
|- bgcolor= 
| 27 || April 29 || @ Tigers || – || || || — || || – ||
|- bgcolor= 
| 28 || April 30 || @ Tigers || – || || || — || || – ||
|-

|- bgcolor=
| 29 || May 2 || @ Royals || – || || || — || || – ||
|- bgcolor=
| 30 || May 3 || @ Royals || – || || || — || || – ||
|- bgcolor=
| 31 || May 4 || @ Royals || – || || || — || || – ||
|- bgcolor= 
| 32 || May 5 || @ Braves || – || || || — || || – ||
|- bgcolor= 
| 33 || May 6 || @ Braves || – || || || — || || – ||
|- bgcolor= 
| 34 || May 7 || @ Braves || – || || || — || || – ||
|- bgcolor=#f7e1d7
| 35 || May 8 || Rays || – || || || — || || – ||
|- bgcolor=#f7e1d7
| 36 || May 9 || Rays || – || || || — || || – ||
|- bgcolor=#f7e1d7
| 37 || May 10 || Rays || – || || || — || || – ||
|- bgcolor=#f7e1d7
| 38 || May 12 || Pirates || – || || || — || || – ||
|- bgcolor=#f7e1d7
| 39 || May 13 || Pirates || – || || || — || || – ||
|- bgcolor=#f7e1d7
| 40 || May 14 || Pirates || – || || || — || || – ||
|- bgcolor=#f7e1d7
| 41 || May 15 || Angels || – || || || — || || – ||
|- bgcolor=#f7e1d7
| 42 || May 16 || Angels || – || || || — || || – ||
|- bgcolor=#f7e1d7
| 43 || May 17 || Angels || – || || || — || || – ||
|- bgcolor=#f7e1d7
| 44 || May 18 || Angels || – || || || — || || – ||
|- bgcolor= 
| 45 || May 19 || @ Blue Jays || – || || || — || || – ||
|- bgcolor= 
| 46 || May 20 || @ Blue Jays || – || || || — || || – ||
|- bgcolor= 
| 47 || May 21 || @ Blue Jays || – || || || — || || – ||
|- bgcolor= 
| 48 || May 23 || @ Yankees || – || || || — || || – ||
|- bgcolor= 
| 49 || May 24 || @ Yankees || – || || || — || || – ||
|- bgcolor= 
| 50 || May 25 || @ Yankees || – || || || — || || – ||
|- bgcolor=#f7e1d7
| 51 || May 26 || Rangers || – || || || — || || – ||
|- bgcolor=#f7e1d7
| 52 || May 27 || Rangers || – || || || — || || – ||
|- bgcolor=#f7e1d7
| 53 || May 28 || Rangers || – || || || — || || – ||
|- bgcolor=#f7e1d7
| 54 || May 29 || Guardians || – || || || — || || – ||
|- bgcolor=#f7e1d7
| 55 || May 30 || Guardians || – || || || — || || – ||
|- bgcolor=#f7e1d7
| 56 || May 31 || Guardians || – || || || — || || – ||
|-

|- bgcolor= 
| 57 || June 2 || @ Giants || – || || || — || || – ||
|- bgcolor= 
| 58 || June 3 || @ Giants || – || || || — || || – ||
|- bgcolor= 
| 59 || June 4 || @ Giants || – || || || — || || – ||
|- bgcolor= 
| 60 || June 6 || @ Brewers || – || || || — || || – ||
|- bgcolor= 
| 61 || June 7 || @ Brewers || – || || || — || || – ||
|- bgcolor= 
| 62 || June 8 || @ Brewers || – || || || — || || – ||
|- bgcolor=#f7e1d7
| 63 || June 9 || Royals || – || || || — || || – ||
|- bgcolor=#f7e1d7
| 64 || June 10 || Royals || – || || || — || || – ||
|- bgcolor=#f7e1d7
| 65 || June 11 || Royals || – || || || — || || – ||
|- bgcolor=#f7e1d7
| 66 || June 13 || Blue Jays || – || || || — || || – ||
|- bgcolor=#f7e1d7
| 67 || June 14 || Blue Jays || – || || || — || || – ||
|- bgcolor=#f7e1d7
| 68 || June 15 || Blue Jays || – || || || — || || – ||
|- bgcolor= 
| 69 || June 16 || @ Cubs || – || || || — || || – ||
|- bgcolor= 
| 70 || June 17 || @ Cubs || – || || || — || || – ||
|- bgcolor= 
| 71 || June 18 || @ Cubs || – || || || — || || – ||
|- bgcolor= 
| 72 || June 20 || @ Rays || – || || || — || || – ||
|- bgcolor= 
| 73 || June 21 || @ Rays || – || || || — || || – ||
|- bgcolor=#f7e1d7
| 74 || June 23 || Mariners || – || || || — || || – ||
|- bgcolor=#f7e1d7
| 75 || June 24 || Mariners || – || || || — || || – ||
|- bgcolor=#f7e1d7
| 76 || June 25 || Mariners || – || || || — || || – ||
|- bgcolor=#f7e1d7
| 77 || June 26 || Reds || – || || || — || || – ||
|- bgcolor=#f7e1d7
| 78 || June 27 || Reds || – || || || — || || – ||
|- bgcolor=#f7e1d7
| 79 || June 28 || Reds || – || || || — || || – ||
|- bgcolor=#f7e1d7
| 80 || June 30 || Twins || – || || || — || || – ||
|-

|- bgcolor=#f7e1d7
| 81 || July 1 || Twins || – || || || — || || – ||
|- bgcolor=#f7e1d7
| 82 || July 2 || Twins || – || || || — || || – ||
|- bgcolor= 
| 83 || July 3 || @ Yankees || – || || || — || || – ||
|- bgcolor= 
| 84 || July 4 || @ Yankees || – || || || — || || – ||
|- bgcolor= 
| 85 || July 5 || @ Yankees || – || || || — || || – ||
|- bgcolor= 
| 86 || July 6 || @ Yankees || – || || || — || || – ||
|- bgcolor= 
| 87 || July 7 || @ Twins || – || || || — || || – ||
|- bgcolor= 
| 88 || July 8 || @ Twins || – || || || — || || – ||
|- bgcolor= 
| 89 || July 9 || @ Twins || – || || || — || || – ||
|- bgcolor=#bbcaff
| ASG || July 11 || @ T-Mobile Park || NL @ AL || || || — || || — || 
|- bgcolor=#f7e1d7
| 90 || July 14 || Marlins || – || || || — || || – ||
|- bgcolor=#f7e1d7
| 91 || July 15 || Marlins || – || || || — || || – ||
|- bgcolor=#f7e1d7
| 92 || July 16 || Marlins || – || || || — || || – ||
|- bgcolor=#f7e1d7
| 93 || July 17 || Dodgers || – || || || — || || – ||
|- bgcolor=#f7e1d7
| 94 || July 18 || Dodgers || – || || || — || || – ||
|- bgcolor=#f7e1d7
| 95 || July 19 || Dodgers || – || || || — || || – ||
|- bgcolor= 
| 96 || July 20 || @ Rays || – || || || — || || – ||
|- bgcolor= 
| 97 || July 21 || @ Rays || – || || || — || || – ||
|- bgcolor= 
| 98 || July 22 || @ Rays || – || || || — || || – ||
|- bgcolor= 
| 99 || July 23 || @ Rays || – || || || — || || – ||
|- bgcolor= 
| 100 || July 24 || @ Phillies || – || || || — || || – ||
|- bgcolor= 
| 101 || July 25 || @ Phillies || – || || || — || || – ||
|- bgcolor= 
| 102 || July 26 || @ Phillies || – || || || — || || – ||
|- bgcolor=#f7e1d7
| 103 || July 28 || Yankees || – || || || — || || – ||
|- bgcolor=#f7e1d7
| 104 || July 29 || Yankees || – || || || — || || – ||
|- bgcolor=#f7e1d7
| 105 || July 30 || Yankees || – || || || — || || – ||
|- bgcolor= 
| 106 || July 31 || @ Blue Jays || – || || || — || || – ||
|-

|- bgcolor= 
| 107 || August 1 || @ Blue Jays || – || || || — || || – ||
|- bgcolor= 
| 108 || August 2 || @ Blue Jays || – || || || — || || – ||
|- bgcolor= 
| 109 || August 3 || @ Blue Jays || – || || || — || || – ||
|- bgcolor=#f7e1d7
| 110 || August 4 || Mets || – || || || — || || – ||
|- bgcolor=#f7e1d7
| 111 || August 5 || Mets || – || || || — || || – ||
|- bgcolor=#f7e1d7
| 112 || August 6 || Mets || – || || || — || || – ||
|- bgcolor=#f7e1d7
| 113 || August 8 || Astros || – || || || — || || – ||
|- bgcolor=#f7e1d7
| 114 || August 9 || Astros || – || || || — || || – ||
|- bgcolor=#f7e1d7
| 115 || August 10 || Astros || – || || || — || || – ||
|- bgcolor= 
| 116 || August 11 || @ Mariners || – || || || — || || – ||
|- bgcolor= 
| 117 || August 12 || @ Mariners || – || || || — || || – ||
|- bgcolor= 
| 118 || August 13 || @ Mariners || – || || || — || || – ||
|- bgcolor= 
| 119 || August 14 || @ Padres || – || || || — || || – ||
|- bgcolor= 
| 120 || August 15 || @ Padres || – || || || — || || – ||
|- bgcolor= 
| 121 || August 16 || @ Padres || – || || || — || || – ||
|- bgcolor= 
| 122 || August 18 || @ Athletics || – || || || — || || – ||
|- bgcolor= 
| 123 || August 19 || @ Athletics || – || || || — || || – ||
|- bgcolor= 
| 124 || August 20 || @ Athletics || – || || || — || || – ||
|- bgcolor=#f7e1d7
| 125 || August 22 || Blue Jays || – || || || — || || – ||
|- bgcolor=#f7e1d7
| 126 || August 23 || Blue Jays || – || || || — || || – ||
|- bgcolor=#f7e1d7
| 127 || August 24 || Blue Jays || – || || || — || || – ||
|- bgcolor=#f7e1d7
| 128 || August 25 || Rockies || – || || || — || || – ||
|- bgcolor=#f7e1d7
| 129 || August 26 || Rockies || – || || || — || || – ||
|- bgcolor=#f7e1d7
| 130 || August 27 || Rockies || – || || || — || || – ||
|- bgcolor=#f7e1d7
| 131 || August 28 || White Sox || – || || || — || || – ||
|- bgcolor=#f7e1d7
| 132 || August 29 || White Sox || – || || || — || || – ||
|- bgcolor=#f7e1d7
| 133 || August 30 || White Sox || – || || || — || || – ||
|-

|- bgcolor= 
| 134 || September 1 || @ Diamondbacks || – || || || — || || – ||
|- bgcolor= 
| 135 || September 2 || @ Diamondbacks || – || || || — || || – ||
|- bgcolor= 
| 136 || September 3 || @ Diamondbacks || – || || || — || || – ||
|- bgcolor= 
| 137 || September 4 || @ Angels || – || || || — || || – ||
|- bgcolor= 
| 138 || September 5 || @ Angels || – || || || — || || – ||
|- bgcolor= 
| 139 || September 6 || @ Angels || – || || || — || || – ||
|- bgcolor= 
| 140 || September 8 || @ Red Sox || – || || || — || || – ||
|- bgcolor= 
| 141 || September 9 || @ Red Sox || – || || || — || || – ||
|- bgcolor= 
| 142 || September 10 || @ Red Sox || – || || || — || || – ||
|- bgcolor=#f7e1d7
| 143 || September 11 || Cardinals || – || || || — || || – ||
|- bgcolor=#f7e1d7
| 144 || September 12 || Cardinals || – || || || — || || – ||
|- bgcolor=#f7e1d7
| 145 || September 13 || Cardinals || – || || || — || || – ||
|- bgcolor=#f7e1d7
| 146 || September 14 || Rays || – || || || — || || – ||
|- bgcolor=#f7e1d7
| 147 || September 15 || Rays || – || || || — || || – ||
|- bgcolor=#f7e1d7
| 148 || September 16 || Rays || – || || || — || || – ||
|- bgcolor=#f7e1d7
| 149 || September 17 || Rays || – || || || — || || – ||
|- bgcolor= 
| 150 || September 18 || @ Astros || – || || || — || || – ||
|- bgcolor= 
| 151 || September 19 || @ Astros || – || || || — || || – ||
|- bgcolor= 
| 152 || September 20 || @ Astros || – || || || — || || – ||
|- bgcolor= 
| 153 || September 21 || @ Guardians || – || || || — || || – ||
|- bgcolor= 
| 154 || September 22 || @ Guardians || – || || || — || || – ||
|- bgcolor= 
| 155 || September 23 || @ Guardians || – || || || — || || – ||
|- bgcolor= 
| 156 || September 24 || @ Guardians || – || || || — || || – ||
|- bgcolor=#f7e1d7
| 157 || September 26 || Nationals || – || || || — || || – ||
|- bgcolor=#f7e1d7
| 158 || September 27 || Nationals || – || || || — || || – ||
|- bgcolor=#f7e1d7
| 159 || September 28 || Red Sox || – || || || — || || – ||
|- bgcolor=#f7e1d7
| 160 || September 29 || Red Sox || – || || || — || || – ||
|- bgcolor=#f7e1d7
| 161 || September 30 || Red Sox || – || || || — || || – ||
|- bgcolor=#f7e1d7
| 162 || October 1 || Red Sox || – || || || — || || – ||
|-

Regular season standings

American League East

American League Wild Card

Roster

Farm system

References

External links 
 2023 Baltimore Orioles season at official site
 2023 Baltimore Orioles season at Baseball Reference

Baltimore Orioles seasons
Baltimore Orioles
Baltimore Orioles